Katherine Hattam (born 1950) is a Melbourne-born Australian artist. Her work is in the collections of the National Gallery of Australia, National Gallery of Victoria, Queensland Art Gallery, University of Queensland, Queensland University of Technology, Artbank, Heide, Art Gallery of South Australia, Deakin and La Trobe Universities, Warrnambool Art Gallery and Bendigo Art Gallery. She is the mother of artist William Mackinnon.

Career 
Hattam obtained a BA in Literature and Politics from Melbourne University in 1974 and held her first exhibition at George Paton & Ewing Gallery in 1978. In 1992 she was awarded a MFA by the Victorian College of the Arts, and in 2004 she was awarded a PhD by Deakin University.

Hattam has won the Banyule Prize and the Robert Jacks Drawing Prize, and has been a finalist in the Dobell Prize, the Geelong Contemporary Arts Prize, the Tidal Art Award, and the Sulman Prize. Her portrait, Helen Garner speaks French, was a finalist for the 2022 Archibald Prize.

References 

1950 births
Living people
Australian painters
Australian sculptors
Artists from Melbourne
20th-century Australian women artists
20th-century Australian artists
21st-century Australian women artists
21st-century Australian artists
Victorian College of the Arts alumni 
Deakin University alumni
University of Melbourne alumni